The Lac de l'Enfer is a body of water in the watershed of the Rivière à Mars and the Saguenay River. Lac de l'Enfer is located in the unorganized territory of Lac-Pikauba, in the MRC of Charlevoix Regional County Municipality, in the administrative region of Capitale-Nationale, in the province of Quebec, in Canada. Lac de l'Enfer is located in the northern part of the Laurentides Wildlife Reserve.

The watershed of Lac de l'Enfer is mainly served indirectly by the forest road R0287 which runs on the southwest side along a higher segment of the rivière du Moulin. This last road connects north to route 175 which connects the city of Quebec (city) to Saguenay (city). Some other secondary forest roads serve the sector for forestry and recreational tourism activities.

Forestry is the main economic activity in the sector; recreational tourism, second.

The surface of Lac de l'Enfer is usually frozen from the beginning of December to the end of March, however safe circulation on the ice is generally done from mid-December to mid-March.

Geography 
The main watersheds near Lac de l'Enfer are:
 north side: Bras de l'Enfer, Conscrits stream, rivière à Mars, Bras Sec, lac Georges;
 east side: Georges lake, rivière à Mars, Lake Ha! Ha!, Ha! Ha! River;
 south side: rivière du Moulin, Cyriac River, Pikauba Lake, Lac Decoigne;
 west side: rivière du Moulin, Cyriac River, Vermette stream, Petite rivière Pikauba.

This lake is located in the Laurentides Wildlife Reserve in the massif of Laurentian Mountains. This lake has a peninsula attached to the southeast shore stretching for  towards the center of the lake.
This lake is mainly fed by the outlet (coming from the north) of Lake Lucifer and by the Bras de l'Enfer. The mouth of this lake is located at:
  southwest of Lac Georges;
  northeast of the course of the rivière du Moulin;
  north-east of the forest road R0287;
  south-west of the summit of Mont des Conscrits;
  south-west of the confluence of the Bras de l'Enfer and the rivière à Mars;
  northeast of the course of the Cyriac River;
  southwest of Lake Ha! Ha!.

Toponymy 
The toponym “Lac de l'Enfer” appeared in the Dictionary of Rivers and Lakes of the Province of Quebec (1925), page 256.

The toponym "Lac de l'Enfer" was formalized on June 1, 1971, by the Commission de toponymie du Québec.

References 

Lakes of Capitale-Nationale
Charlevoix Regional County Municipality
Laurentides Wildlife Reserve